The Ethnographic Museum of Transylvania is situated in Cluj-Napoca, Romania. With a history of almost 100 years, the Ethnographic Museum of Transylvania is one of the first and greatest of its kind in Romania. It has two exhibition sections, one of which is to be found in downtown Reduta Palace (21, Memorandumului Street), while the other exhibition section is the open-air Romulus Vuia Park situated on the city's north-west side, in Hoia Forest.

History 
Muzeul Etnografic al Ardealului was founded June 16, 1922.

Collection 
The museum has a collection of more than 50,000 objects reflecting the occupations, the habits and the life style of the Transylvanian rural population. Part of this collection is to be found in the  Reduta Palace while the rest of the objects are in the open-air section.

Reduta Palace 
The collection here presented is a representative selection of the items and clothes used in rural everyday life. Besides, Reduta Palace also houses a collection of some 50,000 photographs and some 5,000 diapositives. The library of the museum has some 12,000 scholarly journals and specialized magazines.

The Ethnographic Park "Romulus Vuia" 
Parcul Etnografic Romulus Vuia, the open-air section of the museum. It opened to the public on April 12, 1929, which makes it the first open-air museum in Romania. However, the park is closed to the public from the beginning of November to the end of April.

The most ancient objects here exhibited date from 1678. The park's main collection is composed of:

 13 traditional farms with some 90 buildings collected from several transylvanian ethnographical regions: Ţara Moţilor, Ţara Năsăudului, Bistriţa, Câmpia Transilvaniei, Maramureş, Székely Land, Ţara Zarandului, Podgoria Albă, Oaş Country, Gurghiu, Ţara Călatei, Bran
 34 rural technical installations (mills...)
 5 workshops
 3 wooden churches
 a wooden carved cemetery gate.

Gallery

See also 

Museums in Cluj :
 Cluj-Napoca Art Museum
 National Museum of Transylvanian History
 Water Museum
 Pharmacy Museum
 Babeş-Bolyai University Museums:
 Babeş-Bolyai University Museum
 "Emil Racoviţă" Museum of Speleology
 Museum of Mineralogy
 Botanical Museum
 Museum of Paleontology and Stratigraphy
 Zoological Museum

External links 
 Official site of the museum

Bibliography 

 Bodea Gheorghe. Clujul vechi și nou. Cluj-Napoca, 2002
 Lukács József. Povestea oraşului-comoară. Scurtă istorie a Clujului şi monumentelor sale Cluj-Napoca : Apostrof, 2005.

Museums in Cluj-Napoca
Ethnographic museums in Romania
Open-air museums in Romania